Wang Tao (born 14 June 1957) is a Chinese handball player. She competed at the 1988 Summer Olympics and the 1996 Summer Olympics. She later became the president of the Chinese Handball Association.

References

1957 births
Living people
Chinese female handball players
Olympic handball players of China
Handball players at the 1988 Summer Olympics
Handball players at the 1996 Summer Olympics
Place of birth missing (living people)
Asian Games medalists in handball
Asian Games silver medalists for China
Medalists at the 1990 Asian Games
Handball players at the 1990 Asian Games